Cintia Lee (born 9 April 1993) is a road cyclist from Guatemala. She became the Guatemalan National Road Race and Time Trial champion in 2014.

Major results
2014
Copa Guatemala de Ciclismo de Pista
1st Points Race
3rd Omnium

References

External links
 profile at Procyclingstats.com

1993 births
Guatemalan female cyclists
Living people
Place of birth missing (living people)